John Bush (fl. 1411 – 1426), of Cambridge, was an English politician.

He was a Member (MP) of the Parliament of England for Cambridge in 1411 and 1426.

References

14th-century births
15th-century deaths
People from Cambridge
English MPs 1411
English MPs 1426